Giresun, formerly Cerasus (Ancient Greek: Κερασοῦς, Greek: Κερασούντα), is the provincial capital of Giresun Province in the Black Sea Region of northeastern Turkey, about  west of the city of Trabzon.

Etymology
Giresun was known to the ancient Greeks as Choerades or more prominently as Kerasous or Cerasus, the origin of the modern name.

The name Kerasous consists of the Greek words κερασός (kerasós) "cherry" + -ουντ (a place marker). Thus, the Greek root of the word "cherry", κερασός (kerasós), predates the name of the city, and the ultimate origin of the word cherry (and thus the name of the city) is probably from a Pre-Greek substrate, likely of Anatolian origin, given the intervocalic σ in Κερασοῦς and the apparent cognates of it found in other languages of the region. According to Pliny, the cherry was first exported from Cerasus to Europe in Roman times by Lucullus.

Another theory derives Kerasous from κέρας (keras) "horn" + -ουντ (a place marker), for the prominent horn-shaped peninsula that the city is situated on (compare with the Greek name for the horn-shaped Golden Horn waterway in Istanbul, Κέρας (Keras) "Horn"). The toponym would have later mutated into Kerasunt (sometimes written Kérasounde or Kerassunde), and the word "cherry" (as well as its cognates found in other local languages) was derived from the name of the city itself, rather than the other way around.

Pharnaces I of Pontus renamed the city Pharnacia after himself after he captured the city in 183 BC; and it was called by that name as late as the 2nd century AD. According to A. H. M. Jones, the city officially reverted to its original name, Kerasous, in 64 AD.

The Greek name Kerasous was Turkified into Giresun after Turks gained permanent control of the region in the late 15th century.

Geography

The surrounding region has rich agriculture, growing most of Turkey's hazelnuts as well as walnuts, cherries, leather and timber, and the port of Giresun has long handled these products. The harbor was enlarged in the 1960s, and the town is still a port and commercial center for the surrounding districts.

Like everywhere else on the Black Sea coast, it rains (and often snows in winter) and is very humid throughout the year, with a lack of extreme temperatures both in summer and winter. As a result, Giresun and the surrounding countryside are covered with luxuriant flora. Just beyond the city are hazelnut groves, and there are high pastures (yayla) further in the mountains.

Climate 
Giresun has a humid subtropical climate (Cfa or Cf) under both the Köppen and Trewartha climate classifications, with warm, humid summers and cool, damp winters. As a part of the very humid southern Black Sea coast, it experiences frequent precipitation throughout the year, with a small peak in rainfall days in spring and fall. Giresun is the cloudiest city in Turkey, as well as one of the cloudiest cities of the temperate latitudes; with annual sunshine of around 1,000 hours, it is more akin to far northwestern Europe.

Snowfall is somewhat common between the months of December and March, snowing for a week or two, and it can be heavy once it snows.

The water temperature is cool in winter and warm in summer and fluctuates between 8 °C (46 °F) and 24 °C (75 °F) throughout the year.

History 

Giresun was founded circa 180 BC by Pharnaces I of Pontus, who sent Greek citizens from Kotyora (modern Ordu) to colonize the area. The name of the city was first cited in the book Anabasis by Xenophon as Kerasus. Historic records reveal that the city was dominated by the Miletians, Persians, Romans, Byzantines and Empire of Trebizond. The older parts of the city lie on a peninsula crowned by a ruined Byzantine fortress, sheltering the small natural harbor. Nearby is Giresun Island, in ancient times called Aretias, the only major Black Sea island in Turkish territory. According to legend, the island was sacred to the Amazons, who had dedicated a temple to the war god Ares here. Even today, fertility rites are performed there every May, usually involving the famed boulder named the Hamza Stone on the east side of the island, now shrouded as a popular practice but in reality a 4,000-year-old celebration.

Cerasus in late antiquity became a Christian bishopric, and the names of several of its bishops are preserved in the acts of church councils: Gregorius at the Council of Ephesus in 431, Gratianus at the Council of Chalcedon in 451, Theophylactus at the Third Council of Constantinople in 680, Narses at the Trullan Council in 692, Ioannes at the Second Council of Nicaea in 787, and Simeon at the Photian Council of Constantinople in 879. An episcopal seal records a Leo of the 9th century, and a Michael was transferred from here to the see of Ancyra at the time of Michael Caerularius. It was the seat of a Greek Orthodox metropolitan until 1703, when the city was placed under the metropolitan of Trebizond. Accordingly, it is today listed by the Catholic Church as a titular see. The Ecumenical Patriarchate of Constantinople also considers Cerasus (Kerasous), together with Chaldia and Cheriana, as a titular metropolitanate in Turkey.

During the medieval period, Kerasunt was part of the Byzantine Empire and later the second city of the Empire of Trebizond ruled by the Komnenian dynasty. Alexios II Komnenos, Emperor of Trebizond, defeated the Turkmen "Koustoganes" at Kerasunt in September 1302; to secure his victory, Alexios II built a fortress which overlooks the sea. From 1244 onwards the Seljuk Turks moved into the area, pursued at times by the Mongol hordes until in 1461, subsequent to the fall of Constantinople, the whole of this coast was brought within the Ottoman Empire by Sultan Mehmed II. It was briefly occupied by Emirate of Hacıemiroğlu (Emirate of Chalybia) between 1398 and 1400. Local traditions claim that Kerasunt held out for many months after the fall of Trebizon in 1461, then surrendered on terms that the Christian inhabitants could remain and retain their arms, but were required to maintain a boat for the use of the Turks on a nearby river.

4.2 km east-northeast of Kerasus is a fortified island called Ares (Αρητιας νήσος or Αρεώνησος). According to the poetic account of Apollonius of Rhodes, it was here that the Argonauts encountered both the Amazons and a flock of vicious birds. The Greeks of the island held out against the Ottomans for 7 years after the fall of Trebizond (modern Trabzon) in 1461.

Economy

Historically, Giresun was known for producing hazelnut. As of 1920, hazelnuts covered 460 square miles of the area.
 Manganese mines were also in the area, producing 470 tons as of 1901.

Sports
The city owns a football team Giresunspor and a football stadium Çotanak Sport Complex.

In the city was born Alperen Şengün (25 July 2002) a Turkish professional basketball player for the Houston Rockets of the National Basketball Association (NBA).

Places of interest
 The well preserved Giresun Castle in the city center
 Giresun Island 
 Museum, Children's Library, Hacı Hüseyin Mosque, Kale Mosque, Seyyid-i Vakkas Tomb, Mausoleum of Topal Osman
 Giresun Archaeological Museum (the former Gorgora church)
 Old Ottoman houses of Zeytinlik district
 Kırkharman Kilisesi, a former Greek church
 Highlands (Kümbet, Bektaş, Kulakkaya, Çakrak, Tohumluk, Kurtbeli, Kazıkbeli, Ayıbeli, Beytarla, Buları, Kırkharman)
 Kuzalan Falls and Blue Lake
 Duroğlu

Notable people 
 Ashot Zorian (1905–1970), Turkish-born Egyptian painter and educator, of Armenian ethnicity

International relations

Twin towns - sister cities
Giresun is twinned with:

 Alba, Italy
 Bátonyterenye, Hungary
 La Louvière, Belgium
 Ölgii, Mongolia
 Sagae, Japan
 Shaki, Azerbaijan
 Urmia, Iran

References

The Byzantine Monuments and Topography of the Pontos by A. Bryer and D. Winfield
The Encyclopaedia of Pontian Hellenism.

External links

Giresun culture and travel info
Giresun.com.tr (in Turkish)
Giresun culture and travel info (in Turkish)
 Photographic survey and partial plan of Giresun Fortress 
Çanakçı photos 
Kerasus (Giresun) 

 
Populated places in Giresun Province
Populated places established in the 2nd century BC
Black Sea port cities and towns in Turkey
Greek colonies in Pontus
Fishing communities in Turkey
Populated coastal places in Turkey
Districts of Giresun Province
Members of the Delian League
Sinopean colonies